Giyanoo Mal also known as Giyanchand Essrani is a Pakistani politician who has been a Member of the Provincial Assembly of Sindh since August 2018.

Early life 
He was born on 1 January 1960.

Political career

He was elected to the Provincial Assembly of Sindh as a candidate of Pakistan Peoples Party (PPP) on reserved seat for minorities in 2013 Pakistani general election.

He was re-elected to Provincial Assembly of Sindh as a candidate of PPP from Constituency PS-81 (Jamshoro-II) in 2018 Pakistani general election.

On 5 August 2021, he was induced into the cabinet of Government of Sindh as Proviniclal Minister for Minorities Affairs.

References

Living people
Sindh MPAs 2013–2018
Pakistan People's Party MPAs (Sindh)
1960 births
Sindh MPAs 2018–2023